Amin Ramadan (born 1 January 1981) is an Egyptian rower. He competed in the men's lightweight coxless four event at the 2008 Summer Olympics.

References

External links
 
 

1981 births
Living people
Egyptian male rowers
Olympic rowers of Egypt
Rowers at the 2008 Summer Olympics
Place of birth missing (living people)